914 Palisana, provisional designation , is a Phocaean asteroid from the inner regions of the asteroid belt, approximately 77 kilometers in diameter. It was discovered by German astronomer Max Wolf at Heidelberg Observatory on 4 July 1919.

Description 

The carbonaceous  asteroid is classified as a CU-type on the Tholen taxonomic scheme. It orbits the Sun at a distance of 1.9–3.0 AU once every 3 years and 10 months (1,407 days). Its orbit has an eccentricity of 0.21 and an inclination of 25° with respect to the ecliptic.

Measurements using the adaptive optics at the W. M. Keck Observatory give a diameter estimate of 76 km. The size ratio between the major and minor axes is 1.16. During 2004, the asteroid was observed occulting a star. The resulting chords were used to determine a diameter estimate of 91.2 km. This is a poor match to the diameter determined by other means.

The minor planet is named after the Austrian astronomer Johann Palisa (1848–1925), who has discovered many asteroids himself between 1874 and 1923.

References

External links 
 Lightcurve plot of 914 Palisana, Palmer Divide Observatory, B. D. Warner (2008)
 Asteroid Lightcurve Database (LCDB), query form (info )
 Dictionary of Minor Planet Names, Google books
 Asteroids and comets rotation curves, CdR – Observatoire de Genève, Raoul Behrend
 Discovery Circumstances: Numbered Minor Planets (1)-(5000) – Minor Planet Center
 
 

000914
Discoveries by Max Wolf
Named minor planets
000914
19190704